Kelly K. Fajardo (born July 28, 1971) is an American politician who served as a Republican member of the New Mexico House of Representatives for the 7th district from 2013 to 2023.

Elections
2012 with District 7 Republican state Representative David Chavez ran for New Mexico Senate and left the seat open, Fajardo was unopposed for the June 5, 2012, Republican primary, winning with 793 votes and won the November 6, 2012, general election with 4,522 votes (50.4%) against former Democratic Representative Andrew Barreras, who had lost the seat to David Chavez in 2010 after two terms.

References

External links
Campaign site
Kelly K. Fajardo at Ballotpedia

Hispanic and Latino American state legislators in New Mexico
Hispanic and Latino American women in politics
Place of birth missing (living people)
1971 births
Living people
Republican Party members of the New Mexico House of Representatives
People from Belen, New Mexico
Women state legislators in New Mexico
21st-century American politicians
21st-century American women politicians